The 1967–68 UCLA Bruins men's basketball team won a second consecutive NCAA national championship, the fourth in five years under head coach John Wooden, with a win over North Carolina.

UCLA's 47-game winning streak came to an end in January when they were beaten by Houston and All-American Elvin Hayes in the Astrodome 71–69; the game was known as the Game of the Century. The Bruins avenged the loss in a rematch with Houston in the NCAA Final Four, by beating the Cougars 101–69 to become the only team to win consecutive NCAA championships twice.

Season Summary
This team ushered in a new era of college hoops when it played and lost to Houston in a regular-season game at Houston Astrodome that was seen by a national television audience. The Bruins avenged the only loss in the Final Four, thrashing the Cougars behind Lew Alcindor’s 19 points and 18 rebounds. "Big Lew" was even more dominant in the title game, with 34 points and 16 boards in a win over North Carolina. UCLA limited Houston's Elvin Hayes, who was averaging 37.7 points per game but was held to only 10. Bruins coach John Wooden credited his assistant, Jerry Norman, for devising the diamond-and-one defense that contained Hayes.

Players

Lew Alcindor would suffer the first major injury of his athletic career. He suffered a scratched left cornea on January 12, 1968, in a game against the California Golden Bears. He got struck by Ted Henderson of Cal in a rebound battle. He would miss the next two games against Stanford and Portland. This happened right before the game against the University of Houston.

Schedule

|-
!colspan=9 style=|Regular Season

|-
!colspan=12 style="background:#;"| NCAA Tournament

Rankings

Notes
 The team opened the season as the No. 1 team in both the AP and UPI polls.
 Second consecutive national championship; fourth in five years.
 UCLA became the first school to have a top winner in both basketball and football in the same year with quarterback Gary Beban winning the Heisman Trophy and Lew Alcindor winning the U.S. Basketball Writers Association player of the year award in 1968.
 Three days after he was benched by Coach Wooden during the "Game of the Century" on January 20, Edgar Lacey, a high school All-American at Jefferson High School and Los Angeles City Section Player of the Year in 1963, quit the team.
 On its 50th anniversary in 2018, the team was honored at halftime of the UCLA–Stanford game at Pauley Pavilion on January 27.

Awards and honors
 Lew Alcindor, NCAA basketball tournament MOP (1968)
 Lew Alcindor, USBWA College Player of the Year  
 Lew Alcindor, Helms Foundation Player of the Year award
 Lew Alcindor, First Team All-American; Lucius Allen, Second Team

Team players drafted into the NBA

References

External links
1967–68 UCLA Bruins at Sports-Reference.com

Ucla Bruins
UCLA Bruins men's basketball seasons
NCAA Division I men's basketball tournament championship seasons
NCAA Division I men's basketball tournament Final Four seasons
Ucla
UCLA Bruins men's basketball team
UCLA Bruins men's basketball team